Everybody Happy is the debut studio album by the rock band Gigolo Aunts. It was released in 1988 on Coyote Records.

Critical reception
Trouser Press called the album "sprightly but wimpy and amateurish." Spin called it a "spent piece of used jet trash."

Track listing
US Version (Coyote Records) Catalog Number: TTC 88146 (1988), Formats: LP, Cassette

"Summertime Evening"  (S. Hurley)  3:50
"Avalanche"  (S. Hurley)  2:43
"Slipping Away"  (S. Hurley)  3:17
"Marble Statue"  (S. Hurley)  3:20
"Outside-Inside"  (S. Hurley)  3:25
"Her Face Contorted"  (S. Hurley)  4:25
"I Can See"  (D. Gibbs, P. Hurley, S. Hurley)  2:47
"Coming Clean"  (D. Gibbs)  3:12
"People Walk Up"  (S. Hurley)  4:10
"Not for Me"  (S. Hurley)  2:35
"Holy Toledo"  (S. Hurley)  2:22
"Is Everybody Happy?"  (S. Hurley)  3:25

References

1988 debut albums
Gigolo Aunts albums